is a Japanese manga series written and illustrated by Bisco Hatori. It was serialized in Hakusensha's LaLa magazine between the September 2002 and November 2010 issues. The series follows Haruhi Fujioka, a scholarship student at Ouran Academy, and the other members of the popular host club. The romantic comedy focuses on the relationships within and outside the Club.

The manga has been adapted into a series of audio dramas, an animated television series directed by Takuya Igarashi and produced by Bones, a Japanese television drama series, a 2012 live-action film adaptation, and a visual novel by Idea Factory.

As of December 2011, Ouran High School Host Club had over 13 million copies in circulation.

Plot

The comedic series revolves around the escapades of Haruhi Fujioka, a scholarship student at the prestigious Ouran Academy, an elite private school for rich kids located in Bunkyo, Tokyo. Looking for a quiet place to study, Haruhi stumbles upon the otherwise-abandoned Third Music Room, a place where the Host Club, a group of six male students, gathers to entertain female "clients" with food, themed parties, and flirtatious conversation and behavior. During their initial encounter, Haruhi accidentally destroys an antique vase valued at ¥8,000,000 (around US$80,000) and must work off the debt as the club's errand boy. Her short hair, slouching attire, and gender-ambiguous face cause her to be mistaken by the Hosts for a male student, though they soon realize her actual gender and the fact that she's a "natural" in entertaining girls. In response, they decide to "promote" her to a member of the Host Club so that she may work off her debt by procuring a certain number of clients by the time she graduates, all while concealing her gender from the rest of the student body as well as their growing feelings for her.

Media

Manga

The Ouran High School Host Club manga series was serialized between the September 2002 and November 2010 issues of LaLa magazine. The individual chapters were collected in eighteen tankōbon volumes between August 5, 2003 and April 5, 2011.

Hakusensha released a fanbook for the series on August 4, 2009 titled . The series is licensed in English North America by Viz Media under its Shojo Beat imprint, and in Indonesia in the monthly manga magazine Hanalala. It is published in Singapore (in both simplified Chinese and English) by Chuang Yi, and in Poland by JPF.

Anime

A 26-episode anime television series aired between April 5 and September 26, 2006 on NTV, adapting the first eight volumes of the manga. The series was produced by Nippon Television, VAP, Bones and Hakusensha. It was directed by Takuya Igarashi, with Yōji Enokido handling series composition and writing the scripts, Kumiko Takahashi designing the characters and Yoshihisa Hirano composing the music. It features a different cast from the audio dramas, with Maaya Sakamoto as Haruhi Fujioka and Mamoru Miyano as Tamaki Suoh.

The series is licensed for distribution in North America by Funimation Entertainment. Caitlin Glass is the ADR director of the series. The first anime DVD set containing the first thirteen episodes was released on October 28, 2008 in North America. The second volume containing the last thirteen episodes was released on January 6, 2009. On April 27, 2009, the series made its North American television debut on the Funimation Channel. The series is also available for digital streaming on the Funimation app, but was moved over to the Crunchyroll streaming service in 2022 after the latter was acquired a year prior by Sony Pictures Television, Funimation's parent company who acquired in 2018. On September 1, 2022, Netflix began streaming the series in 190 countries.

Music and audio CDs
Three drama CDs were released in 2003, as well as two tracks included in LaLa magazine's 28th and 29th anniversary CDs. Three soundtracks were released by Video and Audio Project for the Ouran High School Host Club anime adaptation. The first, Ouran High School Host Club Soundtrack & Character Song Collection (Part 1), was released in Japan on July 26, 2006, and contained twenty tracks, including the anime opening theme song. The second, Ouran High School Host Club Soundtrack & Character Song Collection 2, included an additional nineteen tracks and was released on August 23, 2006. On September 20, 2007, a third soundtrack, the Ouran High School Host Club Soundtrack & Character Song Collection Special Edition was released containing eight songs from the previous two tracks, with four additional songs.

Visual novel
The Ouran Host Club visual novel was released for PlayStation 2 on April 19, 2007 by Idea Factory. Based on the television series, the player makes decisions as Haruhi that affect the other hosts feelings toward her. The game features Jean-Pierre Léo, a longtime French friend of Tamaki, and Sayuri Himemiya, a childhood friend of Haruhi, designed by the series creator. There are two other original characters. The game has been released exclusively in Japan. A Nintendo DS port of the game, updated with a fully voiced cast and new character-specific scenarios, was released on March 19, 2009.

Live-action TV series and film

A live-action TV series of Ouran began airing in Japan on TBS on July 22, 2011. The live-action adaption features Yusuke Yamamoto as Tamaki Suou and Haruna Kawaguchi as Haruhi Fujioka.

A live-action film of Ouran was announced during a fan meeting on August 25, 2011 and continues off from the conclusion of the television series. All actors of the live-action television series reprised their roles. The film was released on March 17, 2012. It was released on DVD and Blu-ray Disc on October 10, 2012.

The series had a spin-off named Ouran High School Host Club: Haruhi no Happy Birthday Daisakusen with the same cast that was originally broadcast on January 6, 2012, by LISMO drama, a mobile drama provided by au. This LISMO drama tells an original story worked on by the author of the manga. The drama revolves around the host club members becoming flustered upon learning that it is Haruhi's birthday. Through their misunderstandings about celebrating her birthday, the members make Haruhi angry. Kawaguchi, who plays Haruhi Fujioka, commented, "You will see an explosion of this well-known bright and silly character! It was fun playing the role, and all the host club members enjoyed the filming." Each episode is approximately five minutes long, and there are four episodes.

Reception
As of December 2011, the series had over 13 million copies in circulation. The series is a parody of otaku culture, especially cross-dressing. The club often dresses up in dazzling costumes, and Renge Hōshakuji is also identified as an otaku. Rose Bridges, writing for Anime News Network, regards Ouran as being the first example of a "fujoshi comedy" genre—loosely defined as humorous anime with predominantly male casts that cater to shipping-obsessed fangirls.

The manga artist of the series Bisco Hatori appeared at Anime Expo 2019 at the Los Angeles Convention Center in Los Angeles. During several interviews and panels, she indicated that she would welcome another project concerning the characters and topics covered in Ouran but could not produce an anime and advised fans to continue petitioning the studio. When asked about the Boy Love suggested in the series, she stated that Ouran has always been meant to be a parody of manga, but does not feel there is a thematic gap between shōjo and BL themes. As for Haruhi being a female, it was revealed that the character was originally meant to be a boy, but one of her editors suggested a gender swap. Thus, Hatori invented a female character that "doesn't need to dress up like a boy other than the fact that those are the clothing she wears and likes" without subtext. She expressed that she is not hung up on genre parameters or gender orientation because every person should be proud of being unique while remaining true to themselves. In summation, Hatori stressed Ouran being a story about family and friendship, without any intention of being a pioneer of "fujoshi comedy," though admits that it happened just the same.

Notes

References

External links
Official Ouran High School Host Club manga website 
Official NTV Ouran High School Host Club anime website 
Official IDeaf Ouran Host Club visual novel website 
Official Ouran High School Host Club DS visual novel website 
Official Shojo Beat Ouran High School Host Club manga website
Official Funimation Ouran website
Official TV drama website 

 
2002 manga
2006 anime television series debuts
2011 Japanese television series debuts
2011 Japanese television series endings
Bones (studio)
Cross-dressing in anime and manga
Cross-dressing in video games
Funimation
Hakusensha franchises
Hakusensha manga
Japanese LGBT-related television shows
Japanese high school television series
LGBT in anime and manga
LGBT harem anime and manga
Male harem anime and manga
Manga adapted into films
Nippon TV original programming
Parody anime and manga
Romantic comedy anime and manga
School life in anime and manga
Shōjo manga
TBS Television (Japan) dramas
Viz Media manga
Yomiuri Telecasting Corporation original programming